Ali Ulger is a Turkish mathematician who works in the field of functional analysis.  He got his PhD from University of Besançon in 1972. Between 1978 and 1996, he worked at Boğaziçi University. Then, he moved to Koç University where he still works as Professor of Mathematics.

In 1995, he got the most prestigious scientific award of Turkey, the Science Award of the Scientific and Technological Research Council of Turkey.  He is also a member of Turkish Academy of Sciences.

References

Year of birth missing (living people)
Living people
Turkish mathematicians
Academic staff of Koç University
Academic staff of Boğaziçi University
Recipients of TÜBİTAK Science Award